José Antonio Amor is a Spanish actor.

He studied Economic Science at Complutense University of Madrid. He appeared in El juego de la oca (1965), directed by Manuel Summers. He appeared in Timanfaya (Amor prohibido) (1972), directed by José Antonio de la Loma.

Filmography
 El juego de la oca (1965) as Pablo Cárdenas García
 Su nombre es Daphne (1966)
 Margarita y el lobo (1969) as Lorenzo
 Novela (1971)
 And the Crows Will Dig Your Grave (1971) as Jerry (uncredited)
 Golpe de mano (Explosión) (1970) as Fernando
 La casa de las muertas vivientes (1972) as Oliver Bromfield
 Primavera mortal (1973) as Fernando de Oliva
 Timanfaya (Amor prohibido) (1972)

References

External links
 

Date of birth missing
20th-century Spanish male actors
Spanish male film actors
Spanish male television actors